Nalerigu is the largest town in the East Mamprusi Municipal Assembly in the North East Region of Ghana as well as the traditional capital of the Mamprusi people, the seat of the Paramount Chief, the NaYiri. Nalerigu is also the capital of the North East Region of Ghana.

It is also the location of a private hospital, the Baptist Medical Centre, the college of Health Sciences and the Nalerigu Secondary School (NASS).  The school is a second cycle institution.

Tourism and Attractions
 Gambaga Escarpment
 Doves Caves (Ŋmana Feeri)
 NaYiri Palace
 NaJeringa Wall

References

Populated places in the North East Region (Ghana)